Hu Wei (born 1 January 1983) is a Chinese former footballer.

Career statistics

Club

Notes

References

1983 births
Living people
Chinese footballers
Association football defenders
Chinese Super League players
China League One players
Chongqing Liangjiang Athletic F.C. players
Chengdu Tiancheng F.C. players
Cangzhou Mighty Lions F.C. players
Nantong Zhiyun F.C. players